Passions, whose title can also be translated "Enthusiasms," is a 1994 romantic comedy by Ukrainian director Kira Muratova based on the novellas of Boris Dedyukhin.

It was screened at the Locarno Festival in 1994.

It received two Nika Awards, for Best Picture and Best Director (Muratova). The picture also won the Special Jury Prize of the Kinotavr film festival.

Plot
The film's story unfolds in a small town on the beach. Two females: a blonde - Lilia and a brunette - Violetta, are fond of horse racing and the jockeys are fond of the women. Star jockey Oleg Nikolaev teaches Violetta horse riding and another horseman who is also interested in the same girl, summons Oleg Nikolayev to a duel.

Cast
Renata Litvinova – Lilia
Svetlana Kolenda – Violetta
Mikhail Demidov – Kasyanov
Aleksei Shevchenko – Sasha Milashevski
Sergei Popov – instructor

References

External links

1994 films
Russian romantic comedy films
Ukrainian romantic comedy films
1994 romantic comedy films
Films directed by Kira Muratova